Kaff al-Hammam (also spelled Kaf al-Hamam) is a village and suburb in northwestern Syria, administratively part of the Tartus Governorate, located southeast of Tartus. Nearby localities include Hammam Wasel to the northwest, al-Qadmus to the northeast, Hammam Qanyah and al-Riqama to the east, Brummanet al-Mashayekh to the southeast, al-Shaykh Badr to the south, Brummanet Raad to the southwest and al-Qamsiyah to the west. According to the Syria Central Bureau of Statistics, Kaff al-Hammam had a population of 372 in the 2004 census. The inhabitants of the village are predominantly Ismailis.

References

Populated places in Al-Shaykh Badr District
Ismaili communities in Syria